Patriots Basketball Club, also known as simply Patriots, is a basketball club based in Kigali, Rwanda. Established in 2014, it plays its home games at Amahoro Indoor Stadium. The team is a four-time champion of the Rwanda Basketball League (RBL).

In the 2021 season, the Patriots played in the Basketball Africa League (BAL). The club gained worldwide attention when American star rapper J. Cole signed with the team to play in the BAL.

History
The club Patriots BBC was founded in 2014 by a group of top corporate executives from diverse sectors of the economy. Two years later, the Patriots won their first national championship.

On 21 September 2019, the Patriots won their fourth league title after defeating REG BBC in Game 7 of the finals, in a sold out Kigali Arena. On 26 October, head coach Henry Mwinuka, who won three league championships with Patriots, parted ways with the club to join REG. On 6 November, assistant coach Carey Odhiambo was promoted to become head coach. In April 2021, ahead of the first-ever BAL season, the team signed American Alan Major as new head coach. In April 2021, five days before the release of his album, The Off-Season, American rapper J. Cole signed with the Patriots.

The Patriots played their first BAL game on 16 May 2021 at home in Kigali, beating Nigerian side Rivers Hoopers 83–60. Eventually, the team finished in an impressive fourth place of the tournament.

Players

Current roster

Past rosters
2021 BAL season

Notable players

 Aristide Mugabe
 Walter Nkurunziza
 Sedar Sagamba
 Jean de Dieu Niagunduka

Honours
National Basketball League
Winners (4): 2016, 2018, 2019, 2020
BAL
Fourth place (1): 2021

Season by season

Head coaches

References

External links
Presentation at Afrobasket.com
Presentation at facebook

Basketball teams in Rwanda
Basketball teams established in 2014
2014 establishments in Rwanda
Sport in Kigali
Basketball Africa League teams
Road to BAL teams